Francisco de Souza (born 30 November 1965) is an Angolan judoka. He competed in the men's extra-lightweight event at the 1992 Summer Olympics.

References

External links
 

1965 births
Living people
Angolan male judoka
Olympic judoka of Angola
Judoka at the 1992 Summer Olympics
Place of birth missing (living people)
African Games medalists in judo
African Games bronze medalists for Angola
Competitors at the 1991 All-Africa Games